Serris is a commune in the Seine-et-Marne department in the Île-de-France region in north-central France.

Demographics
Inhabitants of Serris are called Serrissiens in French.

Education
The commune has four primary school groups (combined preschool and elementary schools): Robert Doisneau (opened in 1999), Jules Verne (opened in 2001), Jean de la Fontaine (opened in 1992), and Henri Matisse (opened in 2004).

Collège Madeleine Renaud, a junior high school in Serris, opened in 2005. Lycée Émilie du Châtelet, the senior high school, opened in 2010.

University of Marne-la-Vallée provides university education in the area.  1,300 of its students resided in Serris.

See also
Communes of the Seine-et-Marne department

References

External links

Official site 
Official site  (Archive)
1999 Land Use, from IAURIF (Institute for Urban Planning and Development of the Paris-Île-de-France région) 

Communes of Seine-et-Marne
Val d'Europe